Maja Francis (Maja Francis Alderin) is a Swedish singer best known for her work with First Aid Kit and her closing track on the Netflix series Love & Anarchy.

Biography
Francis grew up in Ängelholm, where her father owned a record store. She is the granddaughter of Scandinavian singer Thory Bernhards. Maja Francis attended Mega Musik Gymnasieskola in Helsingborg.

Francis debuted the single "Last Days of Dancing" in 2015. On August 14, 2015, she released the single "Space Invades My Mind" with Veronica Maggio. On the same day, Francis played on Way Out West's club spinoff Stay Out West, where Maggio visited to perform the single with Francis. In January 2016, her debut EP Come Companion was released. Then in 2017 she appeared with First Aid Kit guesting on their Who By Fire tribute concert to Leonard Cohen where she sang Famous Blue Raincoat and joined in with the So Long, Marianne finale.

She took a break after her pair of 2018 EPs, Cry Baby parts 1 and 2, saying later that "My relationship with music was kind of toxic after releasing my Cry Baby EPs in 2018… so I needed a break." She returned in December 2019, again with First Aid Kit, singing It Must Have Been Love as their tribute to Marie Fredriksson. She released her cover of Kate Bush's This Woman's Work in July 2020. In the same year, she recorded her single 'Anxious Angel' as the final track of the Netflix series Kärlek & Anarki (Love & Anarchy). The CD from First Aid Kit's Who By Fire tribute was released in 2021. Also in 2021, she appeared on a special edition of Jills veranda, and later in the year released her first album A Pink Soft Mess.

Francis has a record contract with Universal Music Group under its Sweden Music label and is listed in Sweden by RMV Grammafon.

Discography

Album
A Pink Soft Mess (2021), nominated for the 2022 by:Larm Nordic Music Prize

EP
Come Companion (January 13, 2016)
Cry Baby (Pt 1) (2018)
Cry Baby (Pt 2) (2018)

Singles
"Just the Way You Are" (September 25, 2014)
"Last Days of Dancing (Acoustic Version)" (April 24, 2015)
"Last Days of Dancing (Remix) (July 24, 2015)
"Space Invades My Mind (Acoustic Version)" (October 21, 2015)
"Anxious Angel", the final track of the Netflix series Love & Anarchy (2019)
"Anxious Angel" (2020) written by Alderin Francis & Johannes Runemark (Axelsson, Runemark & Wikberg)
"Tiny Tornados" (2021)
"PMS Party" (2021)

Charted singles

With First Aid Kit
2019 cover of Roxette's It Must Have Been Love as their tribute to Marie Fredriksson
2021 release of 2017 Leonard Cohen tribute concert Who By Fire where she sang Famous Blue Raincoat

Notes

References

Swedish pop singers
Year of birth missing (living people)
Living people